Bishop's Stortford is a historic market town in Hertfordshire, England, just west of the M11 motorway on the county boundary with Essex,  north-east of central London, and  by rail from Liverpool Street station. Stortford had an estimated population of 41,088 in 2020. The district of East Hertfordshire, where the town is located, has been ranked as the best place to live in the UK by the Halifax Quality of Life annual survey in 2020.  The town is commonly known as “Stortford” by locals.

History

Etymology 
The origins of the town's name are uncertain. One possibility is that the Saxon settlement derives its name from 'Steorta's ford' or 'tail ford', in the sense of a 'tail', or tongue, of land. The town became known as Bishop's Stortford due to the acquisition in 1060 by the Bishop of London.

The River Stort is named after the town, and not the town after the river. When cartographers visited the town in the 16th century, they reasoned that the town must have been named after the ford over the river and assumed the river was called the Stort.

First settlements: pre-Roman and Roman Stortford 
Little is known of Bishop's Stortford until the Roman era, with the evidence being small archaeological finds. Limited evidence of ancient Mesolithic and Microlithic peoples in the form of flakes, cores and an axe have been found on the Meads and Silverleys respectively. Most Bronze Age evidence is from the neighbouring parish of Thorley to the south as opposed to Stortford proper, but a 3,000 year old socketed spearhead has been found at Haymeads Lane within the town. Evidence of settlement has been found on Dunmow Road dating from the Middle Bronze Age through to Romano-British times. In Bishop's Stortford: A History, Jacqueline Cooper concludes "existing evidence suggests that the Stortford area was settled only sparsely in prehistoric times, and nearby places like Braughing and Little Hallingbury were of more importance."

Stortford was on the line of the Roman Road, Stane Street, which ran from St Albans to Colchester via Braughing. Construction started around 50AD on the road. Little evidence from the period survives except for excavations showing a section of the road, evidence of a cremation facility and a burial site. None of the excavations has shown evidence of the Roman fort which likely existed in Stortford. The settlement was probably abandoned in the 5th century after the break-up of the Roman Empire.

Refoundation: post-Roman and medieval Stortford 
Following the end of the Roman era, a new Anglo-Saxon settlement grew up on the site.

However, little is known about Stortford until the 1060s with the evidence becoming much stronger after the Norman Conquest. In 1060 when William, Bishop of London, bought Stortford manor and estate for £8, leading to the town's modern name. By 1086, the motte-and-bailey Waytemore Castle had been built as a local strongpoint for the area. It acted as a centre for defence and civil administration for roughly 125 years before it was dismantled but not destroyed by King John in 1211. Rebuilding of the castle started the following year at John's expense, and John stayed the night in the castle in 1216. By the 15th century, the castle had fallen into disrepair, and the Bishop's Court (one of the administrative structures for the area) moved to Hockerill, to the east of the town.

At the time of the Domesday Book in 1086 the village had a population of around 120, and grew to around 700 by the 13th century.

In terms of governance, early medieval Bishop's Stortford was part of the Braughing Hundred, but acquired burgesses and between 1306 and 1336 was taxed as a borough. No charter survives however, and civil authority passed to two local manor courts at the Castle and the Rectory. Stortford briefly sent two members to parliament in the reigns of Edward II and Edward III, with writs being issued to the town in the 1311–1315, 1318, 1320, 1322 and 1340.

Plague and growth: early modern Stortford 
At the start of the early modern period in the mid 15th century, Stortford was a primarily agricultural community, but had also acquired a tanning industry. By the 16th century, Stortford had become an important centre of the malting industry. Not only were the local soils well suited for grains, but the fact that the town was just 35 miles to London provided an impetus to its development. The economic draw of the maltings and the town's market supported a large number of inns and public houses by the middle of the 16th century pointing to its prosperity.

Over the following hundred years, Stortford grew markedly. The population of Bishop's Stortford reached 1,500 by 1660 as a result of a positive net birth rate and migration to the town. This was despite a series of a dozen plagues between the 1560s and 1660s. The town also enjoyed a series of royal visits in the 17th century, with Charles I visiting the town in 1625, 1629 and 1642.

The years following the last of Charles' visits were to prove somewhat turbulent for the town. During the English Civil War Stortford backed the Parliamentarians, with the Manor of Stortford being sequestered from the Bishop of London and sold off for £2,845. It was returned to the Bishop at the Restoration. The Great Plague of 1666-7, and its lasting effects, reduced the population to only around 600 by 1700. The effects of the plague were so severe that the town had to appeal to the Hertfordshire magistrates, who levied a rate on every parish in the county for the relief of Bishop's Stortford, Hoddesdon and Cheshunt.

Despite the demographic impact of the Great Plague, perhaps the turning point in Stortford's fortunes was the creation of the 'Hockerill by-pass' in 1670. King Charles II had in the 1660s been increasingly travelling from London to Newmarket for the races and disliked the noise and congestion of Stortford, with its oderous market, maltings and tanneries. Moreover, the route was not always passable as noted by diarist Samuel Pepys who in made the following entry in his diary on 23 May 1668: ‘and so to Bishop's Stafford [sic]. The ways mighty full of water so as hardly to be passed’. As a result, the road from London to Newmarket was diverted to the east of the centre of Stortford, and instead ran through the outlying settlement of Hockerill. The inns of Hockerill become an important overnight location for stop overs for overnight coaches to East Anglia. Further demands for improved roads led to the creation of the Essex and Hertfordshire Turnpike Trust (later Hockerill Turnpike Trust) in 1744 to repair the road between Harlow Bush Common and Stump Cross in Great Chesterford. Later Acts of Parliament extended the term of the Trust and allowed new road construction. From March 1785 the mail coaches ran from London to Norwich via Stortford. Thus, the improved highways marked the first of the phases of Stortford's growth driven by emergent transport technology.

The second major transport development to provide a significant boost to the town was the construction of the Stort Navigation, which canalised the River Stort, and opened in 1769. The improvements to the navigation of the Stort were driven by the inability of the malting industry to use the Stort for river transport, which caused significant to the local roads and handed a competitive advantage to neighbouring malting areas like Ware who were linked to London by the River Lea. The work on the canal undertaken by George Jackson (later Sir George Duckett) had the added benefit of alleviating the flooding risk in the town.

Industrial revolution to World War II 
With the roads and Stort navigation providing easy access to London markets, industrialisation came to Stortford. The advent of the Stort navigation brought new industries to the town, with bargemen, lock-keepers, wharfingers, coal and timber merchants all appearing.  The malting industry also saw output significantly increase, with brown malt production doubling between 1788 and 1811. Together with national trends in the brewing industry, the 40 malthouses in Stortford in early 1800s Stortford also helped to stimulate the local brewing trade. At the turn of the 19th century, there were 18 brewers in town which in turn boosted the inn trade. The boom in the town in turn boosted the metal working and bricklaying trades, and also aided the general retail trade. In 1791 there were 30 principal traders according to a contemporary directory.

The vibrancy of the local economy - especially the agricultural trade sector - was demonstrated in 1828 when a consortium of local businessmen built the Bishop's Stortford Corn Exchange, which provided trading accommodation for 65 dealers. By this point, the town directory was listing 200 commercial entries, and 350 by the turn of the century.

The third major transport innovation to have a significant impact upon Stortford was the arrival of the railway in 1842. The line initially ran from London Liverpool Street to Stortford, but by 1845 the line was linked to Norwich. The new rail link brought an almost immediate end to the coaching industry, and the Stort Navigation entered terminal decline. The town, though boomed. Massive new residential estates grew up in the New Town (to the south and west of the historic core) and Hockerill (across the river to the east of the historic core) in the decades following the building of the railway. A  Bishop's Stortford–Braintree branch line was built to Braintree to bring goods into Stortford from the surrounding more rural areas, with the first section to Great Dunmow opening in 1864. The single track line struggled to gain traction, and by 1922 had only seven eastbound and six westbound trains per day. The bus service which started between Stortford and Dunmow in 1920 contributed to the demise of the line which closed to passengers in 1952 and freight in 1972.The mid-19th century onwards also saw the rapid growth in public utilities, public services and governance in the town. The first gas street lights were installed in the town in the 1830s, in 1855 the New Cemetery was opened, in the 1870s a sewage farm and an isolation hospital were built, while in 1895 the town's first proper hospital was opened. By 1911, the Encyclopædia Britannica referred to the town as having strong educational pedigree: "The high school, formerly the grammar school, was founded in the time of Elizabeth.... There are a Nonconformist grammar school, a diocesan training college for mistresses, and other educational establishments."

During World War II, Bishop's Stortford was the evacuation centre for many Britons, including Clapton Girls Technology College.

The modern service-industry town 
In the post-war era the town centre underwent changes with the demolition of a multi-storey car park and surrounding area to make way for a new town centre area and city-type apartments and penthouses on the riverside and elsewhere. Jackson Square (a modern shopping complex) was rebuilt and an extension added.

Stortford continued to grow as a commuter town from the second half of the 20th century onwards, spurred by the construction of the M11 motorway and Stansted Airport, as well as rail links to London and Cambridge. This contributed to its rise in population to almost 38,000 at the time of the 2011 census.

Of the seven suburbs of Thorley, Thorley Park, Havers, Snowley, Bishop's Park, St Michael's Mead and Hockerill, the last is a separate ecclesiastical parish east of the River Stort, centred around the old coaching inns, All Saints in Stansted Road and the railway station. Postwar development has enlarged the town's area further.

Demography

Demographic history 
The earliest reliable population figure for Bishop's Stortford was 120 at the publication of the Domesday Book in 1086. Over the successive centuries the population waxed and waned as a result of economic growth and plagues, and generally only rough population estimates exist. By the time of the first nationwide census in 1801 Stortford's population had reached 2,305 spurred by the town's position on the Hockerill Turnpike and the canalisation of the River Stort. Steady growth continued over the coming decades as the railways spurred industrialisation. Population growth averaged 1.12% per annum through to 1911 and the advent of World War I. Inter-war growth averaged 1.54% per annum. Stortford's population exceeded the county town of Hertford in the 1961 census, even though Stortford's average population growth slowed to 1.39% between World War II and 2020. Sources of population growth have been predominantly natural growth and in-migration, but on a number of occasions the boundaries of Bishop's Stortford parish have been expanded. Most recently this occurred in 1992 when some neighbouring parts of Essex were moved into the town and in 2018 when homes were moved into Stortford from neighbouring Thorley Parish. In 2020 Bishop's Stortford was the largest town in East Hertfordshire.

Ethnicity and nationality 
At the 2011 census, 93.6% of the population of Bishop's Stortford described themselves as white, which was lower than the 96.2% recorded in the 2001 census. The number of people describing themselves as having a white background in 2011 was significantly higher than the England aggregate of 85.4%, but slightly lower than the overall East Hertfordshire figure.

The proportion of Bishop's Stortford residents reporting having been born in the United Kingdom was 87.8%, and was only slightly higher than the English average of 86.2%. Stortford recorded a significantly higher proportion of European Union-born residents than either East Hertfordshire or England. The number of UK-born residents in 2011 was down from the 92.4% recorded in 2001.

Housing 
The number of occupied dwellings in Bishop's Stortford rose from 13,733 in 2001 to 14,920. In Stortford 3.0% of properties were recorded as empty in 2011, compared with 4.3% across England. Overall, the dominant type of housing are detached and semi-detached housing, although the proportion of flats has grown from 13.0% in 2001 to 17.6% in 2011. The proportion of flats is well below the English average of 22.1% 

Home ownership is high in Bishop's Stortford at 72.3% of households, which is above both the East Hertfordshire and English averages. The proportion of properties available for social rent has risen from 9.8% in 2001 to 10.1% in 2011.

Government
Bishop's Stortford has three tiers of local government at parish (town), district, and county level: Bishop's Stortford Town Council, East Hertfordshire District Council, and Hertfordshire County Council.

Historical Development 
Historically, Bishop's Stortford was administered by its parish vestry, in the same way as most small towns and rural areas; no borough corporation was established for the town, despite some limited moves in that direction in the fourteenth century. Bishop's Stortford was included in the hundred of Braughing. The Bishop's Stortford Poor Law Union was established in 1835, covering the town and surrounding parishes in both Hertfordshire and Essex.

On 25 October 1866 a public meeting at the town's corn exchange voted to establish a local board, the Bishop's Stortford Local Board. The parish of Bishop's Stortford was declared to be a local government district with effect from 25 December 1866, and the local board held its first meeting at the corn exchange on 23 February 1867. Jones Gifford Nash was chosen as the first chairman of the local board. The Local Board later established offices at 7 North Street.

Under the Local Government Act 1894, the Bishop's Stortford Local Board became the Bishop's Stortford Urban District Council with effect from 31 December 1894. The new council held its first meeting on 5 January 1895. The last chairman of the local board, John Slater, was appointed the first chairman of the urban district council. The council continued to be based at 7 North Street until the First World War. In 1914 the council bought a large old house called Wharf House at 4 The Causeway. The house had been built by George Jackson, who had also built the adjoining Stort Navigation. Wharf House was renamed the Council House, and served as the council's offices until October 1972, when the council moved to purpose-built offices at 1 The Causeway. The Council House was demolished shortly afterwards to make way for the Jackson Square shopping centre.

Bishop's Stortford Urban District Council was granted a coat of arms on 20 August 1952.

Bishop's Stortford Urban District was abolished under the Local Government Act 1972, becoming part of East Hertfordshire on 1 April 1974. Bishop's Stortford Town Council was established as a successor parish to the old urban district. The former urban district council's offices at 1 The Causeway were taken over by East Hertfordshire District Council, whilst the new town council was based at the former offices of the Braughing Rural District Council at 2 Hockerill Street. The town council moved to the Old Monastery on Windhill in 1994. East Hertfordshire District Council vacated 1 The Causeway in 2013, having consolidated most of its functions at its main offices in Hertford. The district council set up a smaller Bishop's Stortford office in Charringtons House, adjoining 1 The Causeway. The vacated office at 1 The Causeway was demolished in 2017.

Parliamentary Elections 

Bishop's Stortford is the largest town within the Hertford and Stortford County Constituency for elections to the House of Commons of the United Kingdom. The constituency covers Stortford, Hertford, Ware, Sawbridgeworth and the surrounding rural areas. Since the creation of the seat in 1983, it has been represented by Conservative MPs.

Electoral Wards 
For elections to East Herts District Council, Bishop's Stortford is currently divided into five wards: All Saints, Central, Meads, Silverleys and South. However, as a result of a boundary review by the Local Government Boundary Commission for England, the town will be split into six wards from the May 2023 local elections: All Saints, Central, North, Parsonage, South and Thorley Manor. At present, Bishop's Stortford residents elect 13 of the 50 councillors on East Herts Council, but this will rise to 14 out of 50 in May 2023.

For elections to Hertfordshire County Council, out of the 78 electoral divisions in total, three divisions cover Bishop's Stortford: Bishop's Stortford East (comprising the areas covered by the All Saints and Meads District Council Wards), Bishop's Stortford Rural (Bishop's Stortford South, Little Hadham and Much Hadham Wards) and Bishop's Stortford West (Central and Silverleys District Council Wards).

Sister cities 
After 46 years of being twinned with the German town of Friedberg and Villiers-sur-Marne in France, the town council ended links in 2011.

Economy and business
Bishop's Stortford is a prosperous town. The key drivers of its growth according to the Town Wide Employment Study for Bishop's Stortford are "Stansted Airport, an excellent rail service into central London and good road links via the M11 to London, the M25 northern sub-region and Cambridge. Bishop's Stortford is well positioned in relation to the UK's most dynamic economies." This study also highlights Stortford's skilled population, as well as the importance of "quality of life" as an important economic asset. In addition to East Hertfordshire topping the Halifax Quality of Life survey in 2020, Stortford has been highlighted as a popular commuter town in articles in The Times, The Evening Standard, and the Metro newspaper London.

Like the UK as a whole, Bishop's Stortford has a highly service-based economy. In the 2011 census, 84.5% of Stortford residents in employment stated that they worked in a service industry, which was higher than East Hertfordshire (81.2%) and England (81.2%). Of particular note is that 7.9% of local workers are employed in Transportation and Storage which is well above the English average of 5.0%. The most significant employer in this industry is Stansted Airport, which was estimated in 2013 to employ at least 1,000 people who live in Stortford.

Commuters represent a sizeable proportion of the local working age population. The Town Wide Employment Study estimated in 2013 around 3,000 people (round 15% of those in employment) commute from Stortford by rail, with the largest proportion "in all probability" travelling into Central London. This is reflected in Stortford in the 2011 census having a much higher proportion of workers in managerial and professional occupations than the national average, as shown in the table below.

Bishop's Stortford itself has a strong internal economy, with an estimated 16,985 people employed within the town boundaries. There are 329 businesses established in the town centre (as of 2018) represented by the Bishop's Stortford Business Improvement District (BID). There is also a Bishop's Stortford Chamber of Commerce.

Stortford is considered the Principal Town Centre in East Hertfordshire by East Hertfordshire District Council's District Plan, serving as a destination for visitors from beyond the town. There is both an indoor shopping centre, Jackson Square, and a traditional high street running along the axis of South Street, Potter Street and North Street, as well as the adjoining streets. The town has a twice weekly market and a monthly farmers market run by Bishop's Stortford Town Council.

Local media
The Bishop's Stortford Independent newspaper covers Stortford, along with the neighbouring towns of Sawbridgeworth and Stansted Mountfitchet. The newspaper was founded in October 2017 following the closure of the Stortford office of the Herts and Essex Observer newspaper in 2016.  

The town is also covered by a number of print magazines including the Bishop's Stortford Flyer, CM23 Connection, Axis Magazine, and The BISH.

Stortford is covered along with the rest of Hertfordshire on BBC Three Counties Radio.

Transport

Rail

Bishop's Stortford railway station is on the West Anglia Main Line, and was first opened in 1842. There were 2.00 million passenger entries and exits at Bishop's Stortford in 2020/21. All trains are run by Greater Anglia.

Greater Anglia trains provide Bishop's Stortford with a direct link southbound to Harlow, Tottenham Hale and London Liverpool Street, with many services calling at intermediate stations. A direct service to Stratford in East London also operates, which calls at most intermediate stations.

Northbound services link Bishop's Stortford to Cambridge North railway station and Stansted Airport railway station and at certain times, to Ely.

Road 
The M11 motorway passes to the east of Bishop's Stortford. Junction 8 links the motorway to the town, and the M11 carries traffic from Bishop's Stortford directly to Cambridge, Harlow and London. As the road passes the town, Bishop's Stortford falls in the M11 corridor for innovation.

The A120 runs east–west along the northern edge of the town. To the west, the A120 meets the A10 at Puckeridge (for Hertford or Royston). To the east, the A120 passes Stansted Airport en route to Braintree, Colchester, the A12 and Harwich.

Other key routes in the town include:

A1060 to the Hatfield Heath, the Rodings and Chelmsford
A1184 to Sawbridgeworth and Harlow
A1250 east–west route through the town centre
B1383 to Stansted Mountfitchet and Saffron Walden

Air pollution
East Hertfordshire District Council monitors nitrogen dioxide (NO2) levels at Hockerill Junction in the town centre. There are four diffusion tubes around the junction for air quality monitoring. In 2017, three out of four tubes failed to meet the UK National Objective of 40μg/m3 (micrograms per cubic metre):

Air

Stansted Airport is to the east of the town, with rail and bus links to Bishop's Stortford. Stansted serves over 200 destinations globally.

Bus and coach
The town is on the Arriva Shires & Essex bus network. Buses 309, 508, 509 and 510 connect the town to Stansted Airport. Buses 508, 509 and 510 all terminate to the south in Harlow.

Other key routes include the 301 to Saffron Walden, the 351 to Hertford, and the 386 to Stevenage (via Letchworth). There are further routes to rural destinations in Hertfordshire and Essex.

Cycling
Bishop's Stortford is served by cycle routes on regional networks and the National Cycle Network.

National Cycle Route 11 is an incomplete cycle route which will run through the town centre. Completed sections of the route currently pass through Harlow, Sawbridgeworth, Stansted Mountfitchet and Cambridge. The section between Sawbridgeworth and Bishop's Stortford is in development, but when completed, the route will provide a direct, non-stop connection from Bishop's Stortford to the Lea Valley (southbound) and King's Lynn (northbound).

National Cycle Route 16 passes just to the northeast of Bishop's Stortford. The route is segregated from traffic, running non-stop to Great Dunmow. The route continues east on on-road and off-road routes to Braintree and Witham.

The Bishop's Stortford Circular Ride is a recreational cycle route on country lanes to the north of the town. The route begins and ends on Northgate End in the town centre. It passes through Patmore Heath, Stocking Pelham, Brent Pelham, Little Hormead, Braughing and Albury.

The River Stort towpath is a shared-use path which begins in Bishop's Stortford. Running parallel to the river, the path links the town directly to Sawbridgeworth and Harlow, and eventually to the River Lea towpath towards Hertford, or Tottenham and London's East End. Parts of the towpath carry NCR 11. The route is maintained by the Canal and River Trust.

Landmarks 
The historic core of Bishop's Stortford is covered by a Conservation Area, which roughly aligns with the boundaries of the town in 1874-1894. As of the last formal Appraisal of the Conservation Area in 2014, there were 105 listed buildings in Stortford, including 71 within the Conservation Area. Two of the buildings are Grade 1 listed: Waytemore Castle and St Michael's Church. Grade II* listed buildings include 10 Bridge Street (the Black Lion pub), 30 High Street (the Boar's Head restaurant) and 8-10 High Street. Much of the Conservation Area is also an Area of Archaeological Significance.

Castle mound 

Waytemore began as a motte and bailey castle in the time of William the Conqueror. A rectangular great tower was added to the motte in the 12th century. It was improved in the 13th century under King John and a licence for crenellation was granted in the mid-14th century. It lost significance after the Civil War and was used as a prison in the 17th century.

Only earthworks, the large motte, and the foundations of a square tower can now be seen.

All Saints' Church 

In 1935 All Saints' Church, Hockerill was destroyed by fire, and in 1937 a new church, to a spacious, light, and airy design by the architect Stephen Dykes Bower, was erected in its place. This is a Grade II listed building and the tower dominates the eastern skyline of the town. The church contains a notable rose window designed by Hugh Ray Easton and a two-manual Henry Willis II organ. Concerts are also held there.

Notable people

Cecil Rhodes, (1853–1902), the son of the vicar of St Michael's Church, was the founder of the region of Rhodesia (now Zambia and Zimbabwe), and of the De Beers diamond company and the Rhodes Scholarship.
Sir Walter Gilbey, 1st Baronet, businessman, wine merchant and philanthropist.
Caroline Spelman, Conservative MP and former cabinet minister, was born in Bishop's Stortford and attended the Hertfordshire and Essex High School.
Paul Epworth (born 1974), Grammy, BRIT Award and Academy Award (Oscar)-winning record producer.
Sam Smith (born 1992), singer/songwriter, winner of the 2014 BRIT Critics' Choice Award and BBC's Sound of 2014, attended St Mary's Catholic School.

Education 
Stortford schools regularly appear with rankings of the best schools in the country, with Hockerill Anglo-European College, The Hertfordshire and Essex High School, and The Bishop's Stortford High School frequently being top performers in The Sunday Times Schools Guide Hertfordshire County Council is the education authority for the state schools in Bishop's Stortford, and is responsible for admissions.

All of the state primary schools in Stortford have nurseries attached, while all of the state secondaries have sixth forms. Bishop's Stortford High School and Herts and Essex High School are a single sex boys and girls school, respectively, from years 7-11 but both have mixed-sex sixth forms. There is also an independent school, the Bishop's Stortford College, which covers the whole educational spectrum from ages 4 to 18.

There are no further education or higher educational institutions in Stortford. However, nearby educational options include Stansted Airport College, Harlow College, Hertford Regional College, and Cambridge Regional College.

Sports

Football 
Semi-professional football team Bishop's Stortford F.C. were formed in 1874, and play at Woodside Park in the town. Currently members of the Isthmian Football League Premier Division, the seventh tier of the English football pyramid, the club have won two national titles – the 1973–74 FA Amateur Cup and the 1980-81 FA Trophy. It is the first club to win both competitions.
 Bishop's Stortford Community Football Club are one of the largest clubs of their type in the country, with over 80 teams and nearly 1,000 members as of the 2020–21 season.

Hockey 
Bishop's Stortford Hockey Club was formed in 1948 and is based at The Hertfordshire and Essex High School with a clubhouse and state of the art pitch. They have fourteen senior sides – six men's and eight ladies' playing in the East Hockey Leagues. The Men's 1st XI play in the East Men's Division 1 South and the Ladies 1st XI play in the Vitality Women's Conference East. – along with a thriving junior section with over 500 members.

The club has a number of current and former international players still involved with coaching or playing, including Rob Clift (gold medallist), Bernie Cotton, Pippa Bull, Vernon Brown, Ronnie Stott, in addition to a number of senior members who still represent their country at Masters level.

Cricket 
Bishop's Stortford Cricket Club play their home matches at Cricket Field Lane, which is also a home venue for Hertfordshire County Cricket Club. Thorley Cricket Club play in Bishop's Stortford, and as of 2021 had 40 adult members and over 100 children in their summer coaching programme. Hockerill Cricket Club play at their ground on Beldams Lane which they share with Bishop's Stortford Running Club. BSRC supports road running and cross-country running.

Rugby 
Bishop's Stortford Rugby Football Club play in National League 1, the third tier of English rugby. In total the club has around 700 male players across its Mini, Youth and Senior teams, as well as over 80 female players, as of 2021.

Other Sports 
Public sports facilities include the Grange Paddocks swimming pool and gym, a tennis club, a squash club, and a golf club. A concrete skateboard park plaza featuring a back-and-forth run with a quarter-pipe and flat bank either side of several ledges and a rail is located in the town park. Bishop's Stortford Town Council is investing in the facility to create a broader "teenage recreation space".

Culture

South Mill Arts 

The South Mill Arts complex  (formerly the Rhodes Arts Complex) incorporates a theatre, cinema, dance studio and conference facilities. Situated within the complex, in the house where Cecil Rhodes was born, is the Bishop's Stortford Museum. It has a local history collection, a unique collection relating to Rhodes and the British Empire in Africa, as well as a temporary exhibition gallery.

South Mill Arts is the town's largest live music venue. In the 1960s, the Rhodes Theatre had a string of concerts by now very high-profile musicians, who were then at the start of their careers. Performers included David Bowie, Stevie Wonder and Lulu as well as iconic bands such as The Who, The Animals, The Moody Blues, Small Faces and Wayne Fontana and The Mindbenders.

Other
Located in the town centre is the Complex, Anchor Street Entertainment, a multiplex which contains a cinema, health club, a bowling alley and a number of food outlets.

The town is home to two amateur dramatics groups, The Water Lane Theatre Group and Bishop's Stortford Musical Theatre Company.

The town is home to various youth organisations and youth groups, including an Army Cadet Force detachment, an Air Training Corps squadron, Scout troops, and a GAP youth group affiliated to the Church of St James the Great in Thorley

Fairs 
There is an annual Christmas Fayre in December, with over 100 stalls and family-friendly entertainment. There is also a summer Carnival, involving a procession with over 100 community groups taking part, bands, fairground rides, entertainers and stalls.

Pubs 

Being a market town and major coach stop between London and Cambridge, Bishop's Stortford has many large public houses within the town centre. In 1636 The Star in Bridge Street was run by John Ward. The Inn was acquired by Hawkes and Co. and bought in 1808. In the early 20th century The Star catered for cyclists, providing cycle sheds that attracted people from local villages. John Kynnersley Kirby (1894–1962), painted local scenes and portraits of local characters, painted the interior of The Star for a painting entitled 'The Slate Club Secretary'.

Other public houses included the 15th-century Boars Head, 16th-century Black Lion, and the Curriers Arms was in Market Square from the 1700s until 1904. in the building which until recently was a Zizzi restaurant. Between 1644 and 1810, the Reindeer operated on the present site of the Tourist Information Centre.

Geography
Stortford has grown around the River Stort valley, with the town centre lying about 60 metres above sea level, rising to over 100 metres above sea level on the eastern and western margins of the town.Being in the south-east, the town enjoys a warmer climate than most of Britain and summer temperatures may sometimes reach the mid-30s C/ it is also one of the driest places in the country. Snow is often seen in the winter months because the town is near the east coast, where cold, moist air is brought in from the North Sea and cold fronts from northern Europe. In recent years there has been up to three inches of snow early in the year, which has resulted in minor disruption to transport and caused some schools to close for several days. However, the snow tends not to persist in any noticeable quantity.

Water for the town is supplied by Affinity Water. The water is classed as very hard with over 345 mg/L of minerals and 0.225 mg/L of fluoride.

Climate
Stortford, along with the rest of Britain, has a temperate maritime climate, with cool summers and mild winters. The nearest weather station for which averages and extremes are available is Stansted Airport, about  due east of Stortford's town centre. Located at an elevation of over 100 m, the weather station, and parts of Stortford in general are marginally cooler throughout the year than the Cambridgeshire area to the north or the London area to the south. Nonetheless, Stortford is still warmer than the English average.The highest temperature recorded at Stansted was  during the August 2003 heatwave. The lowest temperature recorded at Stansted was  during December 1981. Notably cold minimum temperatures tend not to occur due to the lack of higher terrain meaning little cold air drainage occurs.

Typically, the Stortford area will receive an average of 622 mm of rain during the course of the year. 1 mm or more of rain will be recorded on 114.7 days of the year.

Temperature averages refer to the period 1971–2000, rainfall averages to 1961–1990.

Arms

References

External links

Bishop's Stortford Town Council
Bishop's Stortford and Thorley: A History and Guide – comprehensive history

 
Towns in Hertfordshire
Market towns in Hertfordshire
Civil parishes in Hertfordshire
River Stort
East Hertfordshire District